Angraecum gabonense is a species of comet orchid that can be found in Cameroon, the Democratic Republic of the Congo, Equatorial Guinea and Gabon.

It is usually found in dense lowland forest rich in Caesalpinioideae up to 1,350 m elevation. It can be found growing on fallen tree trunks or large branches of Gilbertiodendron dewevrei and Julbernardia seretii.

It is threatened by deforestation for logging or oil palm plantations.

References

gabonense
Orchids of Africa
Orchids of Cameroon
Orchids of Gabon